Roger Foulon (3 August 1923 – 23 February 2008) was a Belgian writer in French.

He was the author of more than 120 works. He was the president of the Association of Belgian Writers in the French Language, from 1973 to 1994.  From 1999 until his death he was a member of Belgian Royal Academy of French Language and Literature. He was born and died in Thuin.

Works 
 L'espérance abolie,  1976.
 Un été dans la Fagne, Brussels,  1980. Prix Georges Garnir.
 Vipères, Brussels, 1981.
 Barrages, Brussels,  1982.
 Déluge, Brussels,  1984.
 Naissance du monde, 1986.
 Les tridents de la colère,  1991.
 L'homme à la tête étoilée,  1995.

Awards
Prix Georges Garnir, 1980.

References

External links
"Roger Foulon Poète, nouvelliste, conteur, romancier..." 

1923 births
2008 deaths
Belgian writers in French
People from Thuin